Tubifex  is a cosmopolitan genus of tubificid annelids that inhabits the sediments of lakes, rivers and occasionally sewer lines. At least 13 species of Tubifex have been identified, with the exact number not certain, as the species are not easily distinguishable from each other.

Reproduction
Tubifex worms are hermaphroditic: each individual has both male (testes) and female (ovaries) organs in the same animal. These minute reproductive organs are attached to the ventral side of the body wall in the celomic cavity. In mature specimens, the reproductive organs are clearly found on the ventral side of the body.

Copulation and cocoon formation
Although the Tubifex worms are hermaphrodites, the male and female organs become mature at different times; thus self-fertilization is avoided, and cross-fertilization is encouraged. Two mature Tubifex worms undergo copulation by joining ventral and anterior surfaces together with their anterior ends pointing opposite directions. Thus, the spermathecal opening of each worm is nearer to the male apertures of another worm. The penial setae of one worm penetrate into the tissues of other worm and thus the conjugants are held together. At this stage, the sperm of one worm is passed into the spermathecae of the other worm. 
After copulation, they separate and begin to produce egg cases containing eggs, called cocoons. The cocoon is formed around the clitellum as a soft, box-like structure into which the ova and the sperm are deposited. Soon, the Tubifex worm withdraws its body from the egg case by its backward wriggling movements.

Culturing Tubifex 
Tubifex are raised commercially, mainly for fish food: the reddish Tubifex tubifex. Tubifex can be easily cultured on mass scale in containers with 50- to 75-mm thick pond mud at the bottom, blended with decaying vegetable matter and masses of bran and bread. Continuous, mild water flow is to be maintained in the container, with a suitable drainage system. After the arrangement of the system, the container is inoculated with Tubifex worms which can be obtained from nearby muddy canals or sewage canals. Within 15 days, clusters of worms develop and can be removed with mud in masses. When worms come to the surface due to lack of oxygen, they are collected and washed under brisk stream of water to remove residual mud attached to their bodies.

Live food
Tubifex worms are often used as a live food for fish, especially tropical fish and certain other freshwater species.  They have been a popular food for the aquarium trade almost since its inception, and gathering them from open sewers for this purpose was quite common until recently.  Most are now commercially obtained from the effluent of fish hatcheries, or from professional worm farms.

Using these worms as a live food has come with certain problems over the years.  When harvested from sewers, open bodies of water, and even from hatcheries, they may be infected with various diseases.  This risk can be partially solved by keeping the worms under brisk running water until they have voided the contents of their digestive systems.  However, the worms can still be vectors for whirling disease, which can affect salmonids.  Additionally, they are very difficult for some fish to obtain in the wild, so certain fish, such as Rift Valley cichlids, will obsessively consume them until they make themselves sick.  Additionally, while the worms have good-quality proteins, they also are very fattening, and are poor in certain important amino acids.  Fish fed on them can grow rapidly, but may be less healthy and colorful than fish with more balanced diets.  Lastly, in poorly cleaned aquaria, Tubifex can become established as a pest species, covering the bottom of the aquarium in a thick carpet which may be considered unsightly.

Tubifex in sewers
In 2009, a large blobby mass made of colonies of Tubifex was found to be living in the sewers of Raleigh, North Carolina.  Revealed by a snake camera inspection of sewer piping under the Cameron Village shopping center, videos of the "creature" went viral on YouTube in 2009 under the name "Carolina poop monster".

Tubifex species
The genus includes the following species:
Tubifex blanchardi (Vejdovský, 1891)
Tubifex harmani Loden, 1979
Tubifex costatus (Claparède, 1863)
Tubifex ignotus (Stolc, 1886)
Tubifex kryptus Bülow, 1957
Tubifex longipenis (Brinkhurst, 1965)
Tubifex montanus Kowalewski, 1919
Tubifex nerthus Michaelsen, 1908
Tubifex newaensis (Michaelsen, 1903)
Tubifex newfei Pickavance & Cook, 1971
Tubifex pescei (Dumnicka 1981)
Tubifex pomoricus Timm, 1978
Tubifex pseudogaster (Dahl, 1960)
Tubifex smirnowi Lastockin, 1927
Tubifex superiorensis Brinkhurst & Cook, 1971
Tubifex tubifex (O. F. Müller , 1774)

References 

Tubificina

it:Tubifex
pl:Rureczniki